Nirmal Sahadev is an Indian film director, screenwriter and actor who works in the Malayalam film industry. He is best known for his directorial debut film Ranam (2018).

Early life

Nirmal Sahadev was born in Thrithala, Palakkad. He completed his primary education at The Abu Dhabi Indian School. He completed his master's degree in mechanical engineering from Georgia Institute of Technology, Atlanta. He has graduated from New York Film Academy in film making.

Film career
Nirmal Sahadev started his film career in Malayalam as an assistant director in Malayalam movie Colours (2009). Later he was the assisted the director in  Monsoon Mangoes (2016). He has also directed an English short film, named "Sleep" (2012). He was the script writer of the Malayalam movie Hey Jude (2018). His directorial debut film in Malayalam was Ranam.

Filmography

As Director & Writer

As Writer

As Assistant Director

As Chief Associate Director

As Actor

References

External links
 

Malayalam film directors
Malayali people
Living people
Malayalam screenwriters
New York Film Academy alumni
People from Palakkad district
Screenwriters from Kerala
Film directors from Kerala
21st-century Indian film directors
1988 births